The 1932 Gonzaga Bulldogs football team was an American football team that represented Gonzaga University during the 1932 college football season. In their second year under head coach Mike Pecarovich, the Bulldogs compiled a 5–3 record and outscored their opponents by a total of 178 to 77.

The team was led by fullback Max Krause who was selected by the United Press as the first-team fullback on the 1932 All-Pacific Coast football team. Krause scored 25 points in the final game of the season, bringing his season total to 86 points. Krause later played eight years in the National Football League for the New York Giants and Washington Redskins.

Schedule

References

Gonzaga
Gonzaga Bulldogs football seasons
Gonzaga Bulldogs f